Best Warrior is an annual competition overseen by the Department of the Army as a means of identifying and recognizing soldiers in active, Special Operations, National Guard and reserve components of the United States Army. Each year, each participating command sends their best enlisted soldier and non-commissioned officer to Fort Lee to represent their unit.

During the competition, competitors are tested for their aptitude through board interviews, physical fitness tests, written exams, urban warfare simulations and other soldier tasks and drills relevant to the Army's operating environment.

In addition, Warriors will go before two selection boards composed of six senior sergeants major from across the Army. These boards, chaired by Sergeant Major of the Army Kenneth O. Preston, evaluate competitor appearance, military bearing and knowledge of critical Army topics.

The Soldier and Non-Commissioned Officer of the Year receive prestigious honors and cash awards in recognition of their achievements and represent the Army at special events throughout the year.

Competition winners

Soldier of the Year

 2002 - Spc. Justin Brown
 2003 - Spc. Russell Adam Burnham (MEDCOM)
 2004 - Spc. Wilfredo Mendez
 2005 - Sgt. Chad Steuck
 2006 - Spc. John Emmett
 2007 - Cpl. Heyz Seeker
 2008 - Spc. David R. Obray (USARC)
 2009 - Spc. Clancey Henderson
 2010 - Sgt. Sherri Gallagher
 2011 - Spc. Thomas M. Hauser
 2012 - Spc. Saral Shrestha
 2013 - Spc. Adam Christensen
 2014 - Spc. Thomas Boyd
 2015 - Spc. Jared R. Tansley (USAREUR)
 2016 - Spc. Robert Miller 
 2017 - Spc. Hazen Ham 
 2018 - Cpl. Matthew Hagensick 
 2019 - Spc. David Chambers 
 2020 - Sgt. James Akinola

Non-Commissioned Officer of the Year 

 2002 - Sgt. 1st Class Jeffery T. Stitzel
 2003 - Staff Sgt. James Luby
 2004 - Staff Sgt. Andrew Bullock
 2005 - Sgt. Jeremy Kamphuis
 2006 - Sgt. 1st Class Jason Alexander
 2007 - Staff Sgt. Jason Seifert
 2008 - Staff Sgt. Noyce Merino NGB
 2009 - Sgt. 1st Class Aaron Beckman
 2010 - Staff Sgt. Christopher McDougall
 2011 - Sgt. Guy Mellow
 2012 - Staff Sgt. Matthew M. Senna
 2013 - Sgt. 1st Class Jason J. Manella
 2014 - Sgt. 1st Class Matthew Carpenter
 2015 - Staff Sgt. Andrew Fink 
 2016 - Sgt. 1st Class Joshua A. Moeller 
 2017 - Staff Sgt. Ryan C. McCarthy 
 2018 - Sgt. 1st Class Sean Acosta 
 2019 - Staff Sgt. Dakota Bowen 
 2020 - Sgt. 1st Class Alexander Berger

References 

United States Army organization